The Gotha Go 241 was a low-wing  twin-engined four-seat transport aircraft manufactured by Gothaer Waggonfabrik in the early 1940s and intended for the general aviation market.

Development
At the beginning of the forties, Gotha decided to develop a tourism aircraft based on the positive experience of the previous two-seater Gotha Go 150. The new model, assigned the Reichsluftfahrtministerium (RLM) designation Go 241, was intended for the civil market and offered greater internal capacity, elevated to four places, even if it reiterated the general approach of Go 150.

Compared to its predecessor in the design phase, all dimensions were increased, with more powerful engines, a pair of air cooled  BMW Bramo Sh 14A radials  and a twin tail unit. The aircraft was later re-ngined with  Hirth HM 506A inverted 6-cyl in-line engines.

The prototype was taken to the air for the first time in 1940 with good results, given that it was decided to start mass production, but given the need to give priority to aeronautical production for war purposes, the project was shelved. The only example was destroyed during an Allied bombing raid on the Gotha factory in November 1944.

Specifications (Go 241 - Hirth engines)

References

Further reading
 

1940s German aircraft
Go 241
Aircraft first flown in 1940